ASTM International, formerly known as American Society for Testing and Materials, is an international standards organization that develops and publishes voluntary consensus technical standards for a wide range of materials, products, systems, and services. Some 12,575 ASTM voluntary consensus standards operate globally.

It is founded in 1902 as the American Section of the International Association for Testing Materials (see also International Organization for Standardization).

History 
A group of scientists and engineers, led by Charles Dudley, formed ASTM in 1898 to address the frequent rail breaks affecting the fast-growing railroad industry. The group developed a standard for the steel used to fabricate rails. Originally called the "American Society for Testing Materials" in 1902, it became the "American Society for Testing And Materials" in 1961. In 2001, ASTM officially changed its name to “ASTM International" and added the tagline "Standards Worldwide". In 2014, it changed the tagline to "Helping our World Work better". Now, ASTM International has offices in Belgium, Canada, China, Peru, Washington, D.C., and West Conshohocken, PA.

On June 9th, 2022, it was announced that the European Committee for Standardization (CEN) and ASTM International have agreed to extend and expand a Technical Cooperation Agreement from 2019.

Membership and organization 
Membership in the organization is open to anyone with an interest in its activities.  Standards are developed within committees, and new committees are formed as needed, upon request of interested members. Membership in most committees is voluntary and is initiated by the member's own request, not by appointment nor by invitation. Members are classified as users, producers, consumers, and "general interest". The latter includes academics and consultants. Users include industry users, who may be producers in the context of other technical commodities, and end-users such as consumers. In order to meet the requirements of antitrust laws, producers must constitute less than 50% of every committee or subcommittee, and votes are limited to one per producer company. Because of these restrictions, there can be a substantial waiting-list of producers seeking organizational memberships on the more popular committees. Members can, however, participate without a formal vote and their input will be fully considered.

As of 2015, ASTM has more than 30,000 members, including over 1,150 organizational members, from more than 140 countries. The members serve on one or more of 140+ ASTM Technical Committees. ASTM International has several awards for contributions to standards authorship, including the ASTM International Award of Merit (the organization's highest award) ASTM International is classified by the United States Internal Revenue Service as a 501(c)(3) nonprofit organization.

Standards compliance 
ASTM International has no role in requiring or enforcing compliance with its standards. The standards, however, may become mandatory when referenced by an external contract, corporation, or government.

 In the United States, ASTM standards have been adopted, by incorporation or by reference, in many federal, state, and municipal government regulations. The National Technology Transfer and Advancement Act, passed in 1995, requires the federal government to use privately developed consensus standards whenever possible. The Act reflects what had long been recommended as best practice within the federal government.
 Other governments (local and worldwide) also have referenced ASTM standards.
 Corporations doing international business may choose to reference an ASTM standard.
 All toys sold in the United States must meet the safety requirements of ASTM F963, Standard Consumer Safety Specification for Toy Safety, as part of the Consumer Product Safety Improvement Act of 2008 (CPSIA). The law makes the ASTM F963 standard a mandatory requirement for toys while the Consumer Product Safety Commission (CPSC) studies the standard's effectiveness and issues final consumer guidelines for toy safety.

See also 
International Organization for Standardization
Materials property
Pt/Co scale
Technical standard

References

External links 
 
 ASTM International
 Standards and Publications

Standards organizations in the United States
 
Organizations based in Pennsylvania
Organizations established in 1898
International organizations based in the United States
Technical specifications
Entertainment companies of the United States